Spandau Synagogue  ("Synagoge Spandau") was a synagogue at 12 Lindenufer in the Old Town area of Spandau, Berlin, Germany. It was also known as Spandauer Vereinssynagoge (i.e. Spandau private synagogue). The synagogue was built in 1894–95 and was destroyed on 9 November 1938 (Kristallnacht) when it was set on fire. The ruins were removed, probably in 1942. The site is now marked by a memorial tablet, installed in 1988. The congregation maintained a Jewish cemetery, on Spandau's Neue Bergstrasse, which was closed by the Nazi government  and was evacuated in 1939 to the Cemetery of the Orthodox congregation Adass Jisroel in Berlin.

History

In 1844 there were only six Jewish families in Spandau. They held services in rented rooms. Late in 1894, Berlin-based architects Wilhelm Albert Cremer and Richard Wolffenstein began the construction of the modern community's first and only synagogue, which was dedicated by the Spandau Jewish community on 15 September 1895 in the presence of Spandau's Mayor, Wilhelm Georg Koeltze (1852–1939), and other local dignitaries.  The building, on a street corner with facades on two sides, was crowned by an octagonal tower.

On 6 December 1916, Arthur Löwenstamm became the synagogue's first permanent rabbi. He took up his duties on 1 April 1917 and continued until the autumn of 1938. In May 1939, the congregation became part of the official Jewish Community of Berlin.

Memorials

Memorial commemorating the synagogue
At the initiative of the Spandau Borough Council, a memorial tablet was unveiled in 1988 on the site of the former synagogue. On 9 November 2005, a memorial plaque was placed on the pavement in front of Löwenstamm's former home at Feldstraße 11, in Spandau, and close to a former Jewish old people's home which had been maintained by the synagogue.

Memorial to the Jews from Spandau who were deported and murdered

In a park opposite the site of the former synagogue there is a memorial, designed by Ruth Golan and Kay Zareh and installed in 1988, to the Jews from Spandau who were deported and murdered by the Nazis. The memorial symbolises a building and tower that have been violently torn down, with one now behind the other. Through the split tower an eternal light shines as a symbol of remembrance of the dead.

In 2012, the memorial was extended by a wall on which the names of 115 deported and murdered Jews from Spandau are recorded. This was also designed by Ruth Golan and Kay Zareh. The project was supported by the Evangelical Church of Spandau district, the district office of Spandau and private sponsors. The memorial was inaugurated on 9 November 2012, the 74th anniversary of Kristallnacht.

The German inscription on the memorial reads: "This memorial commemorates the suffering of Spandau's citizens of Jewish faith during the Terror of the National Socialists. Not far from this point, at Lindenufer 12, stood the Jewish house of worship, which was destroyed in 1938."

The memorial is located on Lindenufer (Altstadt Spandau) at ♁ 52 ° 32 '13 "  N, 13 ° 12 '28 "  E.

See also
Rabbi Arthur Löwenstamm
Monuments in Spandau (German Wikipedia)

Notes

References

External links

1895 establishments in Germany
1938 disestablishments in Germany
Buildings and structures in Spandau
Cremer & Wolffenstein
Heritage sites in Berlin
Holocaust memorials in Germany
Jewish German history
Monuments and memorials to the victims of Nazism in Berlin
Orthodox synagogues in Germany
Spandau
Synagogues completed in 1895
Synagogues destroyed during Kristallnacht (Germany)
Synagogues in Berlin